Manski is a Slavic surname and probably a reduced form of Schimanski. Notable people with the name include:
 Charles F. Manski (1948), American economist
 Dorothee Manski (1895–1967), German-born American operatic soprano and voice teacher

References 

surnames